Spiritfarer is an indie management sim and sandbox action game developed and published by Canadian studio Thunder Lotus Games and released for Microsoft Windows, macOS, Linux, PlayStation 4, Nintendo Switch, Xbox One, Android and Stadia in August 2020. The main character, Stella, becomes a "Spiritfarer" whose job is to ferry spirits of the deceased to the afterlife.

It received generally positive reviews from critics praising its slow-paced gameplay, detailed animation, orchestral musical score and unique themes, and had sold over a million units by December 2021. Following the game's initial release, Thunder Lotus supported Spiritfarer by adding new content via free updates; upon the final update on December 13, 2021, it was retitled Spiritfarer: Farewell Edition. The game was released for iOS and Android via Netflix in October 2022.

Gameplay 
Spiritfarer is an indie adventure game developed by Thunder Lotus Games where the player must meet the needs of the spirits aboard their ship with foods and building boat additions to accommodate those spirits' desires and needs. This leads to the player collecting materials while on their journey to build kitchens, gardens, and other home amenities to help the spirits feel more at home while uncovering more of each spirits backstory as they sail their way to crossing over to afterlife through the Everdoor. These new sections that are added to the ship are placed like a game of Tetris, stacked up on top of one another in any way that fits. The characters that Stella meets along the way also give the player mini-games to play for materials and in-game currency that are relevant to the spirit's character. The game also has vendors that sell items such as seeds for the player's gardens and furniture to decorate their ship, giving the game a more personalized experience.

Plot 
The player takes the role of Stella, accompanied by her pet cat Daffodil, who takes over from the mythological Charon as the new Spiritfarer, a ferrymaster who must sail the sea to find spirits and grant their last wishes and finally take them to the Everdoor, a gateway to the afterlife. In order to assist with her journey, Charon gifts both Stella and Daffodil with the magical Everlight.

After Charon passes through the Everdoor, Stella procures a ship of her own and begins travelling the world, picking up spirits and helping them fulfill their last wishes while befriending them along the way. As she picks up more spirits and collects resources, Stella expands the ship and its capabilities further. However, eventually, Stella must begin sending the spirits to the Everdoor, with each of them giving an emotional send off as they thank Stella for everything she has done for them, leaving her a spirit flower to remember them by. As Stella sends off more and more spirits, she soon begins occasionally encountering Hades, in the form of a giant owl. Hades shows Stella images of what are apparently her past life as a palliative care nurse, taking care of terminally ill patients before falling terminally ill herself. Hades then questions Stella's motivations, wondering whether her desire to help spirits is truly altruistic or simply a selfish means to ease her own insecurities.

Eventually, Stella sends off the last spirit through the Everdoor and she has one final confrontation with Hades. Hades reveals that Stella's real body is on the verge of death in the real world, and it is now her time to pass through the Everdoor. With her purpose fulfilled, Stella sails back to the Everdoor with Daffodil one last time. She passes through the Everdoor with Daffodil and they both become a constellation in the sky.

Development 
Creative director Nicolas Guérin mentions that the game's stories are based on its own experiences of loss. They wanted to make a game that handled death in a way that felt more personal and intimate, referencing the loss of family and loved ones. The original concept had the game take place on a train instead of a boat but the team decided that it did not really fit what they wanted. Changing seasons were also discussed but then scrapped because the scope of putting that into the game was much too large and served little importance to the game as a whole. Farming sections were much larger too, putting the original concept closer to competing simulation games like Harvest Moon and Stardew Valley so Thunder Lotus made the decision to tone it back, making the resource collecting portions not as time consuming and setting it apart from those competitors. The game is also padded with stories from the spirits that measure up to 90,000 words at the time GameSpot published the interview with Guérin on July 28, 2021. Guérin also mentioned doing research at end-of-life care facilities for a month as well as asking staff for Spiritfarer personal stories of loved ones to help flesh out the characters that were already in the works. The characters were designed first and then given raw personality traits, such as being attuned with their inner animal or more human in nature. The game itself is described as a construct of Stella's mind and how she develops her views and understanding of death. Guérin mentions that this is also shown in the landscapes of the islands as the game flows and Stella travels the map.

Reception 

Spiritfarer received "generally favorable reviews" for the PC version, according to review aggregator Metacritic.

IGNs Tom Marks rated the game 9/10 and gave it the Editor's Choice award, comparing the game to a combination of Animal Crossing and an action platformer. He stated that, while the game "tackle[s] the heavy topic of death and those left behind in its wake", it is nonetheless "colorful" and "feel-good". He called the campaign "full of charming characters with somber, touching stories", though stating that "not all the characters are as impactful as others". He stated that the backtracking got "tiresome" and the formula of the game became predictable, with mundane tasks becoming "repetitive fast" if the player attempted to optimize their efficiency, but that the game forcing beloved characters to leave was emotionally affecting.

Rachel Watts of PC Gamer rated the game 85/100, saying that it is a "wholesome life-sim" that "deals with the topic of death and compassion with masterful balance". However, she criticized the "purposeful vagueness" about the nature of the afterlife and its inhabitants as "muddl[ing] the clarity of the characters' intentions". Eric Van Allen of USgamer rated the game 4/5, saying its writing is "warm, funny and charming", and the game is "best enjoyed in small pieces".

It was nominated for Games For Impact and Best Indie Game at The Game Awards 2020. It is also a finalist for the Nebula Award for Best Game Writing and the Hugo Award for Best Video Game.

Thunder Lotus announced that by December 2021, the game had sold one million copies.

Notes

References

External links 
 Official site

2020 video games
Indie video games
Linux games
MacOS games
Sailing video games
Adventure games
Windows games
PlayStation 4 games
Nintendo Switch games
Xbox Cloud Gaming games
Xbox One games
Video games about the paranormal
Video games developed in Canada
Cooperative video games
Video games featuring female protagonists
Stadia games
Video games about cats
Video games about death